Aventignan is a commune in the Hautes-Pyrénées department in southwestern France.

Geography
Close to Aventignan are the Gargas caves, a natural underground formation of stalactites and stalagmites. The caves are sometimes described as the Grotto of Gargas, in reference to an ancient chieftain who used the place as a prison.

Population

See also
Communes of the Hautes-Pyrénées department

References

Communes of Hautes-Pyrénées